South San Francisco station may refer to:

South San Francisco station (BART), a rapid transit station
South San Francisco station (Caltrain), a commuter rail station